is a national park comprising several non-contiguous areas of Mie, Nara, and Wakayama Prefectures, Japan. Established in 1936, the park includes Mount Yoshino, celebrated for its cherry blossoms, as well as elements of the UNESCO World Heritage Site Sacred Sites and Pilgrimage Routes in the Kii Mountain Range.

Places of interest
Notable places of interest include the Dorokyō Gorge, Kumano Hongū Taisha, Kushimoto Marine Park, Mount Ōdaigahara, Mount Ōmine, Mount Yoshino, and Nachi Falls.

Related municipalities
The park crosses the borders of five cities, seven towns, and six villages:
 Mie: Kihō, Kumano, Mihama, Ōdai, Owase
 Nara: Gojō, Kamikitayama, Kawakami, Shimokitayama, Tenkawa, Totsukawa, Yoshino
 Wakayama: Kitayama, Kushimoto, Nachikatsuura, Shingū, Taiji, Tanabe

See also

List of national parks of Japan
Kumano Kodō

References

External links
  Yoshino-Kumano National Park
  Yoshino-Kumano National Park
 Map of Yoshino-Kumano National Park (north)
 Map of Yoshino-Kumano National Park (south)

National parks of Japan
Parks and gardens in Mie Prefecture
Parks and gardens in Wakayama Prefecture
Parks and gardens in Nara Prefecture
Protected areas established in 1936